The 1921–22 League of Ireland was the inaugural season of top-tier football in the Republic of Ireland. It began on 17 September and ended on 17 December 1921.

Teams

Season overview
The first season of the League of Ireland featured eight teams in a single division, all of whom were based in Dublin. All eight teams had spent the previous season playing in the Leinster Senior League, while Bohemians and Shelbourne had also played in the 1919–20 Irish League.

The league was won by St James's Gate, who went on to complete a treble by winning both the FAI Cup and the Leinster Senior Cup, while Shelbourne won the League of Ireland Shield.

Frankfort and YMCA withdrew from the league at the end of the season, and together with Rathmines Athletic and Reds United they make up a group of four clubs who have played just one season in the top level of the League of Ireland.

Standings

Results

Top goalscorers

See also
1921–22 FAI Cup

References

Ireland
League Of Ireland, 1921-22
League of Ireland seasons